Wichita Heights High School, known locally as Heights, is a public secondary school in Wichita, Kansas, United States. It is operated by Wichita USD 259 school district and serves students in grades 9 to 12. The school principal is Eric Filippi. The school colors are red and black.

Wichita Heights is a member of the Kansas State High School Activities Association and offers a variety of sports programs. Athletic teams compete in the 6A division and are known as the "Falcons". Extracurricular activities are also offered in the form of performing arts, school publications, and clubs.

History
Wichita Heights High School was originally approved, planned and built as Wichita Heights Rural School District Number 192, to serve the districts of Bridgeport, Kechi, Kechi Center, Riverside, and Riverview. No secondary school existed at the time for these districts; prior to its construction students were placed into other Wichita area schools. Construction of the school started in 1959, and was finished two years later in 1961 in time for the school year.

In July 1963, the school became part of the Wichita Public School District (Wichita USD 259).  In 1983, Wichita Heights was designated an urban overflow school due to the increasing populations of other inner city schools.

Extracurricular activities

Athletics
The Falcons compete in the Greater Wichita Athletic League and are classified as a 5A school, the second largest classification in Kansas according to the Kansas State High School Activities Association. Throughout its history, Wichita Heights has won twenty five state championships in various sports. Several graduates have gone on to participate in collegiate and professional athletics. The football team won a state championship in 2010 against Olathe North High School on November 27, 2010 by a score of 48–14.

State championships

Wichita Heights High School offers the following sports:

Fall
 Football
 Volleyball
 Boys Cross-Country
 Girls Cross-Country
 Girls Golf
 Boys Soccer
 Girls Tennis
 Cheerleading
 Pommies

Winter
 Boys Basketball
 Girls Basketball
 Boys Swimming/Diving
 Wrestling
 Boys Bowling
 Girls Bowling
 Winter Cheerleading

Spring
 Baseball
 Boys Golf
 Boys Tennis
 Girls Soccer
 Girls Swimming/Diving
 Softball
 Boys Track and Field
 Girls Track and Field

Notable alumni
 Class of 1963: Dennis Rader, serial killer known as BTK
 Class of 1968: Stephen Hill, judge on the Kansas Court of Appeals
 Class of 1972: Cynthia Sikes, actress and former Miss Kansas
 Class of 1972: Ray Troll, Alaskan artist, musician
 Class of 1975: Mark Parkinson, former Governor of Kansas
 Class of 1977: Darnell Valentine, former NBA player
 Class of 1979: Antoine Carr, NBA player
 Class of 1990: Darren Dreifort, former Los Angeles Dodgers pitcher
 Class of 1996: Sheinelle Jones, NBC News and Today journalist
 Class of 1998: Danny Roew, film director
 Class of 1999: Shaun Smith, former NFL player
 Class of 2002: Mike Pelfrey, former Chicago White Sox pitcher
 Class of 2003: Xzavie Jackson, former professional football player
 Class of 2011: Dreamius Smith, former San Diego Chargers running back
 Class of 2012: Perry Ellis, former basketball player at the University of Kansas, 9th all-time leading scorer in school history

See also

 Education in Kansas
 List of high schools in Kansas
 List of unified school districts in Kansas

References

External links

 Official school website
 renovation plans
 new aquatic center
Historical
 Excerpts from A History of Wichita Public School Buildings, USD 259
Map
 Wichita School District - High School Boundary Map, valid starting fall 2012, USD 259
 Wichita School District - Boundary Map and Directory of Buildings, USD 259

Public high schools in Kansas
Schools in Wichita, Kansas
1961 establishments in Kansas